The Security Council of Tajikistan is a Tajik government consultative group under the country's President's Executive Office. which advises the president on national security issues and matters. It was formed in 2003 with the head of being the President of the Republic of Tajikistan. It was formerly and independent organization until June 2018, when it was subordinated to the president. The Secretary of the Security Council since March 2019 has been Nasrullo Mahmudzoda. It is essentially a constituent body of the military and security leadership to work out solutions for the implementation of domestic and foreign policy in the national security field.

Members
Permanent members of the Security Council include the following:

 Supreme Commander-in-chief (chairman)
 Prime Minister
 President's Executive Office
 Secretary of the Security Council
 Chairman of the Majlisi Oli
 Minister of Foreign Affairs
 Minister of Defence
 Minister of Internal Affairs
 Chief of the General Staff

Representatives of the Gorno-Badakhshan Autonomous Region are occasionally present at Security Council meetings when security issues are being discussed in the council.

List of Secretaries 

 Muminzhan Mamadjanov (1992 – 1994)
 Mahmadali Vatanzoda (? –  March 2019)
 Nasrullo Mahmudzoda (since March 2019)

See also
Government of Tajikistan
Security Council of Belarus
National Security and Defense Council of Ukraine
Security Council of Russia
Security Council of Kazakhstan

References

Security Council
2003 establishments in Tajikistan
Tajikistan